Owen Ridge is a very high and rugged mountain ridge, 22 nautical miles (41 km) long, which forms the southwesternmost element of the Sentinel Range, Ellsworth Mountains. It extends south-southeast from Karnare Col and includes Mount Strybing (3,200 m), Mount Southwick and Lishness Peak, ending up in Bowers Corner. Mapped by United States Geological Survey (USGS) from surveys and U.S. Navy aerial photography, 1957–60. Named by Advisory Committee on Antarctic Names (US-ACAN) (1974) for Thomas B. Owen, Assistant Director of National and International Programs, National Science Foundation.

Maps
 Vinson Massif.  Scale 1:250 000 topographic map.  Reston, Virginia: US Geological Survey, 1988.
 Antarctic Digital Database (ADD). Scale 1:250000 topographic map of Antarctica. Scientific Committee on Antarctic Research (SCAR). Since 1993, regularly updated.

Features
Geographical features include:

 Arsela Peak
 Bolgrad Glacier
 Bowers Corner
 Brook Glacier
 Karnare Col
 Kasilag Pass
 Krusha Peak
 Lishness Peak
 Modren Peak
 Mount Allen
 Mount Inderbitzen
 Mount Southwick
 Mount Strybing
 Peristera Peak
 Sirma Glacier
 Stikal Peak

Ridges of Ellsworth Land